"Regntunga skyar" is a song performed by Alice Babs and Adolf Jahr in the Swedish 1940 film Swing it, magistern!

The song is composed by Thore Ehrling and Eskil Eckert-Lundin with lyrics by Hasse Ekman.

Covers 
Robyn performed the song on her 2002 album Don't Stop the Music.

References 

1940 songs
Swedish songs
Swedish-language songs
Songs written for films